This is a list of fictional secret agents .

Books

Agent X.323 in series of novels "Espion X.323" by Paul D'Ivoi
Alec Leamas in John le Carré's The Spy Who Came in from the Cold
Alex Rider, young "informal" MI6 agent in Anthony Horowitz's Alex Rider series. The series also includes Alan Blunt, head of MI6 Special Operations
Ali Imran in the Imran series
Basil Argyros in the Harry Turtledove short story series collected in Agent of Byzanium
Basil St. Florian, the main protagonist of Stephen Hunter's 2021 novel Basil's War
Blackford Oakes is a Central Intelligence Agency officer, spy and the protagonist of a series of novels written by William F. Buckley
Carl Hamilton, Swedish secret agent from the Books of Jan Guillou
Daniel Marchant, MI6 agent in Dead Spy Running and Games Traitors Play by Jon Stock
David Shirazi in Joel C. Rosenberg's The Twelfth Imam
Drongo in Chingiz Abdullayev's books
Emily Pollifax in Dorothy Gilman's books
George Smiley in the novels of John le Carré
Hal Ambler, in The Ambler Warning by Robert Ludlum
Jack Ryan, in The Hunt for Red October and Patriot Games by Tom Clancy
James Adams from the Robert Muchamore's CHERUB series
James Bond in Ian Fleming's books, which also include CIA agent Felix Leiter. See List of James Bond allies for a complete list of 00-agents and secret agents found throughout Fleming's books
James Wormold in Graham Greene's Our Man in Havana
Jane Blonde, in the Jane Blonde series by Jill Marshall
Jason Bourne in the Bourne books by Robert Ludlum
Jerry Cornelius in Michael Moorcock'''s books and short-stories
John Craig in James Munro's books
John Morpurgo in books by William Garner
Scot Harvath in the novels of Brad Thor.
Johnny Fedora in Desmond Cory's books
Kimberly Ouellette in the novel Blood Poppy by Jay Black
Lemmy Caution, in Peter Cheyney's novels
Masud Rana, a major and BCI (Bangladesh Counter Intelligence) agent (codename-MR9) portrayed in the Masud Rana series by Qazi Anwar Hussain
Matt Helm, in Donald Hamilton's books
Michael Jagger in books by William Garner
Mitch Rapp, CIA agent in counterterrorism unit known as the "Orion Team" in books by Vince Flynn
Modesty Blaise, from the books by Peter O'Donnel
Nancy Drew in Carolyn Keene's books
Nick Carter-Killmaster (books)
Normanby in P.G. Dixon's 2021 book NormanbyPaul Kagan in David Morrell's 2008 novel The Spy Who Came for ChristmasPenelope St. John-Orsini, in The Baroness novels by Paul Kenyon
Peter Pettigrew the pet rat of Ron Weasly in Harry Potter working for Lord VoldemortPhilip McAlpine in four novels by Adam DimentPhilip Quest in four novels by Peter Townend
Quiller in the series of thrillers by Elleston Trevor, writing as Adam Hall
Sam Durell in Edward S. Aarons' books
Sam Fisher in Tom Clancy's Splinter Cell books
Scorpion from Andrew Kaplan's book
Sean Ryan, ex-IRA member who features in series of novels by Brian Cleeve
Severus Snape, an agent provocateur, informant, and double agent working for Dumbledore
Sherlock Holmes in Arthur Conan Doyle's books
Simon Templar, "The Saint", from the Leslie Charteris novels and subsequent adaptations
Six in the Agent Six of Hearts series by Jack Heath
Stephen Metcalfe in The Tristan Betrayal by Robert Ludlum
Switters in Fierce Invalids Home from Hot Climates by Tom Robbins
The Hardy Boys in Franklin W. Dixon's books
The Secret Seven written by Enid Blyton (four child detectives)
Tiger/Avinash Singh Rathode, from Bollywood film Ek Tha Tiger
Tim Donohue, British secret agent from the book The Constant Gardener by John le Carré
Wyman Ford, from books by Douglas Preston

Comics

Abbey Chase
Anacleto, agente secreto, Spanish secret agent in the comic series of the same name
Captain Francis Blake
Derek Flint
Dick Tracy
Dynamo, Thunder Agents
Jimmy Olsen
John Stone, agent of S.T.O.R.M. in Wildstorm's comic PlanetaryKGBeast in DC Universe
Lord Peter Flint in WarlordLorraine Broughton in The Coldest City graphic novel
Modesty Blaise
Mortadelo and Filemón Pi, Spanish secret agents of the T.I.A.
Slylock Fox
Sarge Steel is a detective/spy character published by Charlton Comics during the 1960s. As he was published during the time of Charlton's Action Heroes line of superheroes, and had loose ties to some, he is sometimes included with that group. He was purchased by DC Comics along with the other "Action Heroes". 
King Faraday, featured in DC Comics. Faraday first appeared in Danger Trail #1 (July 1950), and was created by Robert Kanigher and Carmine Infantino.
Amanda Waller appears in comic booklets in the DC Comics universe. The character first appeared in the Legends #1 issue of November 1986, and was created by writers John Ostrander and Len Wayne and illustrator John Byrne.
Spy vs. Spy
Twilight (alias Loid Forger), Nightfall (Fiona Frost), Daybreak, from Spy × FamilyMarvel

Black Widow (Natasha Romanova) 
Black Widow (Yelena Belova) 
Clive Reston 
Jimmy Woo 
Maria Hill
Bucky
Richard and Mary Parker 
Peter Parker 
Pete Wisdom
Sharon Carter 
Lord NUke
Elektra Natchios
Nick Fury

Television/film

 Aaron Cross from The Bourne Legacy, a spin-off film from the Jason Bourne trilogy.
 Adam Carter in Spooks Agent 13 from the 1960s spy satire/parody sitcom, Get Smart Agent 44 from the 1960s spy satire/parody sitcom, Get Smart Agent 99 from the 1960s Spy satire/parody sitcom, Get Smart Agent Double 0-0 from Phineas and Ferb Agent Flemming from Beavis and Butthead Do America Agent J from the movies Men in Black (film), Men in Black II Agent K from the movies Men in Black (film), Men in Black II Agent Larabee from the 1960s spy satire/parody sitcom, Get Smart Agent Six from Generator Rex Agent Smith of The Matrix (franchise)
 Alec Leamas, in John le Carré's The Spy Who Came in from the Cold Alexander Scott, from the TV series I Spy Allen Gamble and Terry Hoitz, from the movie The Other Guys Amos Burke, from TV series Burke's Law Annie Walker from the USA original series Covert Affairs Austin Powers from the Austin Powers Movies
 Bob Ho in The Spy Next Door Blain Whitaker in "MI High"
 Brianna Kelleher in Access Denied Bullwinkle J. Moose and Rocky the Flying Squirrel from The Adventures of Rocky and Bullwinkle Burt Macklin in Parks and Recreation (TV series) Callan in Callan (TV series)
 Cammie Morgan, from I'd Tell You I Love You, But Then I'd Have to Kill You Carl The Intern from Phineas and Ferb Carrie Mathison, from Showtime's 'Homeland (TV series)
 Charles Hood, in five novels by James Mayo
 Charles Vine in Licensed to Kill (1965 film)/The Second Best Secret Agent in the Whole Wide World, Where the Bullets Fly, Somebody's Stolen Our Russian Spy
 Chuck Bartowski from the television series Chuck
 Cobra Bubbles from Lilo and Stitch
 Cody Banks from the movie Agent Cody Banks
 Cool McCool, from the cartoon of the same name
 Craig Stirling, Richard Barrett and Sharron McCready from the 1960s series, The Champions
 Darius Stone (Ice Cube) in XXX: State of the Union
 David Percival from Atomic Blonde
 Derek Flint, In Like Flint, Our Man Flint
 Dirk Bannon, Talia Bannon née Knockemoff, Spike Bannon, Elle Bannon and Boris Bannon from My Spy Family TV series
 Dudley Puppy and Kitty Katswell from T.U.F.F. Puppy
 Elihu 'Sam' Nivens in The Puppet Masters
 Elim Garak from Star Trek: Deep Space Nine
 Energy Management Center from Tokumei Sentai Go-Busters
 Erik Heller from the 2011 film Hanna and the 2019 TV series of the same name
 Ethan Hunt in the Mission Impossible film series
 Evelyn Salt in Salt
 Father Unwin from The Secret Service
 FDR Foster in This Means War
 Felicity Sarah Flint in the webcomics Basil Flint, P.I. and Felicity Flint, agent from H.A.R.M.
 Miss Froy, in Alfred Hitchcock's 1938 film The Lady Vanishes
 George Smiley from John le Carré's novels
 Ginger Cat from Talking Friends
 Gru and Lucy from Despicable Me 2
 Hans Kloss/J-23 in Stawka większa niż życie (Stakes Larger Than Life)
 Harry Palmer from The Ipcress File, Funeral in Berlin, and Billion Dollar Brain based on novels by Len Deighton
 Harry Tasker in True Lies
 Hymie the CONTROL robot from the 1960s Spy satire/parody sitcom, Get Smart
 Howard Finch from the CBS crime drama television series Person of Interest
 Irina Derevko from Alias
 Jack Bauer in the Fox TV series 24
 Jack Burns, an agent of Sector 7 in the 2018 film Bumblebee
 Jake Peralta, Rosa Diaz, Charles Boyle, Amy Santiago, and Terry Jeffords from Brooklyn Nine-Nine
 James Bond in the movies based on Ian Fleming's novels, which also include CIA agent Felix Leiter. See List of James Bond allies for a complete list of 00 agents and secret agents found throughout the movies.
 Jason Bourne from Bourne trilogy based on the novels by Robert Ludlum
 Jerry Lewis from Totally Spies. Head of WOOHP.
 Jill Munroe from Charlie's Angels
 John & Jane Smith, from Mr. and Mrs. Smith
 John Casey from the television series Chuck
 John Drake in Danger Man
 John Steed, Cathy Gale Emma Peel and Tara King in The Avengers
 John Reese from the CBS crime drama television series Person of Interest.
 John Steed, Mike Gambit and Purdey in The New Avengers
 June Stahl from Sons of Anarchy
 Kelly Robinson, from the TV series I Spy
 Kelvin Inman in Lost
 Kim Possible, from the TV series Kim Possible
 Lance Sterling from the film Spies in Disguise
 Lancelot Link "Lancelot Link: Secret Chimp"
 Leon S Kennedy, from Resident Evil 4
 Liu Jian from Kiss of the Dragon
 Lorraine Broughton from Atomic Blonde
 Luther Sloan from Star Trek: Deep Space Nine
 Lyla Lolliberry in Phineas and Ferb
 MacGyver from MacGyver
 Martin Rauch (codename Kolibri) from "Deutschland" series (Deutschland 83, Deutschland 86, Deutschland 89)
 Mater, Finn McMissile and Holley Shiftwell from Cars 2
 Matt Helm from The Silencers (1966), Murderer's Row (1966), The Ambushers (1967), The Wrecking Crew (1969)
 Matt in Death Note
 Maxwell Smart from the 1960s spy satire/parody sitcom, Get Smart
 McGruff the Crime Dog
 Michael 'Desolation' Jones from Desolation Jones
 Michael Westen from the USA original series Burn Notice
 Mike Traceur, also known as Michael, Mike, Knight from the 2008 Knight Rider
 Michael Knight, played by David Hasselhoff in the original Knight Rider series
 Mr. Black and Mr. White from Johnny Test
 Mr. Verloc in Joseph Conrad's The Secret Agent
 Mylene Hoffman, from the anime 009-1
 Nikita, Michael, Birkoff, Walter, Madeline, Paul of Section 1 La Femme Nikita
 Number Six in The Prisoner
 Paul Janson in The Janson Directive
 Perry the Platypus from Phineas and Ferb (TV show).
 Peter the Panda from Phineas and Ferb
 Phil Coulson of Marvel Cinematic Universe
 Philip and Elizabeth Jennings of The Americans
 Pinky the Chihuahua from Phineas and Ferb
 The Protagonist from  Tenet
 Rouge the Bat, a secret agent for GUN in the Sonic the Hedgehog series
 Russ Cargill from The Simpsons Movie
 Sam in Spynet
 Sam, Clover and Alex and others from Totally Spies.
 Sameen Shaw from the CBS crime drama television series Person of Interest.
 Sarah Walker from the television series Chuck
 Scarecrow (Lee Stetson) in Scarecrow and Mrs. King
 Secret Squirrel and Morocco Mole
 Several OWCA members in Phineas and Ferb
 Shadow the Hedgehog, a secret agent for GUN in the Sonic the Hedgehog series
 Special Agent Oso
 Stan Smith from the animated series American Dad!
 Sterling Archer from the animated series Archer
 Sydney Bristow in Alias
 The Man from U.N.C.L.E. 1960s TV show; Napoleon Solo and Illya Kuryakin
 Tobin Frost and Matt Weston, the main characters in the 2012 film Safe House
 Tom Quinn in Spooks
 Tony Almeida in the Fox TV series 24
 Tuck Henson in This Means War
 Twilight in Spy × Family
 Vesper Lynd from Casino Royale
 Xander Cage (Vin Diesel) in xXx
 Ziva David from NCIS
 Bill Cunningham from The Enid Blyton Adventure Series

Video games

Ada Wong, from the videogame series Resident Evil
Agent 47, from the videogame series Hitman
Agent Blackbird, Boxer, Deacon, Desdemona, Doctor Carrington, Drummer Boy, Dutchman, Father Clifford, Glory, Helena, Herbert Dashwood, Highrise, Liam "Patriot" Binet, Manya Vargas, Maven, Mister Tims, P.A.M., Ricky Dalton, Songbird, Tinker Tom, Tommy Whispers, Tulip, Victoria Watts, and the Sole Survivor (optional-if you join the Railroad organization) from Fallout 4
Agents Sasha Nein and Milla Vodello from Psychonauts
Alexi Dravic from Alpha Protocol
Big Boss, from the videogame series Metal Gear
Bishop and Shiela from the PS2 video game Spy Fiction
Booger Hasenpfeffer from Webkinz
Cate Archer from No One Lives Forever
Cole Phelps from L. A. Noire
David Wolf from Secret Agent
Desmond from Fallout 3
Director from Club Penguin (EPF)
Dot (D.) from Club Penguin (EPF)
G. from Club Penguin (EPF)
Gabriel Logan from Syphon Filter
Goober Hasenpfeffer from Webkinz
Iron Bull from Dragon Age: Inquisition
JC Denton from Deus Ex
Jet Pack Guy from Club Penguin (EPF)
Joanna Dark in the Nintendo 64 video game Perfect Dark
Michael Thorton from Alpha Protocol
Max Payne from the videogame series Max Payne
Natalya Ivanova from Destroy All Humans 2
Leliana (Sister Nightingale) from the Dragon Age series.
Norman Jayden, from Heavy Rain
PP from Club Penguin (EPF)
Raiden, from the videogame series Metal Gear
Revolver Ocelot, from the videogame series Metal Gear
Rookie from Club Penguin (EPF)
Russell Adler from Call of Duty: Black Ops Cold War
Sam Fisher, from the videogame series Splinter Cell
Solid Snake, from the videogame series Metal Gear
Spy Fox, from the videogame series Spy Fox
Steve Haines, Dave Norton, and Andreas Sanchez from Grand Theft Auto V
Tallis from Dragon Age II: Mark of the Assassin
The Spy from Team Fortress 2
Luciel Choi from Mystic Messenger
Vanderwood from Mystic Messenger
United Liberty Paper Contact and Karen Daniels from Grand Theft Auto IV
Kyle Crane from Dying Light

Radio dramas
Jason Whittaker from Adventures in Odyssey

Parodies of secret agents

Agent 327
Austin Powers
Boris and Natasha from Rocky and Bullwinkle
Brandon Scofield in The Matarese Circle and The Matarese Countdown
Derek Flint from Our Man Flint and In Like Flint
Desmond Simpkins from Carry On Spying
I Spy
Jane Blonde
Johnny English
Joonas G. Breitenfeldt from Agent 000 and the Deadly Curves
Lego Agents
Maxwell Smart and Agent 99 from Get Smart, 1960s TV show
Perry the Platypus from the cartoon Phineas and Ferb
OSS 117
Secret Squirrel, a cartoon character
Spy Kids
Spy vs. Spy
Sterling Archer, from the animated series Archer

See also
 Government
 Emergency
 Police
 United States Border Patrol
 SWAT
 Federal Bureau of Investigation
 Central Intelligence Agency
 List of fictional secret police and intelligence organizations
 List of fictional espionage organizations
 MI5
 Police officer
 Spy agent
 Spy fiction

Spies, List of fictional